Säde Eila Talvikki Pennanen  (8 February 1916, Tampere – 23 January 1994, Tampere) was a Finnish writer, critic, essayist, and translator. A key contributor to nurturing Finnish literature, she published approximately twenty novels and a number of short stories and plays. She worked for 40 years as a literary critic and wrote essays for magazines. Pennanen translated a hundred books, trained translators, and lectured.

Awards
Her awards have included: 
1965, Aleksis Kivi award
1971, Mikael Agricola Prize from the Finnish Cultural Foundation
1974, Väinö Linna Prize

Selected works

References

Bibliography
Pennanen, Eila (1948). : novel. Helsinki: Schildts. 
. Kirjasampo.fi. Accessed 6 March 2014.
Pennanen, Eila; Holmqvist Margaretha (1957). : novel. Helsinki: Söderström.

External links
 Eila Pennanen in 375 humanists – 24 April 2015. Faculty of Arts, University of Helsinki.

1916 births
1994 deaths
People from Tampere
Finnish women novelists
Finnish critics
Finnish essayists
Finnish translators
20th-century translators
20th-century Finnish novelists
20th-century Finnish women writers
20th-century essayists
Thanks for the Book Award winners